Adriana Dávila Soracco (born 20 January 1979) is a Peruvian former footballer who played as a midfielder. She has been a member of the Peru women's national team.

International career
Dávila capped for Peru at senior level during two Copa América Femenina editions (2003 and 2006).

International goals
Scores and results list Peru's goal tally first

References

External links

1979 births
Living people
Peruvian women's footballers
Peru women's international footballers
Women's association football midfielders